Vozrojdénie ('Renaissance') was a Russian language daily newspaper published from Paris, France, founded in 1925. The newspaper was anti-Communist, and circulated amongst the Russian diaspora around the world. As of the mid-1930s, its editor-in-chief was Julien Semenoff.

References

1925 establishments in France
Emigrants from the Russian Empire to France
Newspapers published in Paris
White Russian emigrants to France
Publications established in 1925
Russian-language newspapers
Publications with year of disestablishment missing
Defunct newspapers published in France
Daily newspapers published in France